PBLA may be an initialism for:
Professional Basketball League of America (1947–1948)
Professional Box Lacrosse Association (2022–present)